West Yan'an Road is the name of an interchange station between Lines 3 and 4 on the Shanghai Metro network.

During the 2021 Shanghai People’s Congress deputies suggested to change the station name to Donghua University. “Names of Metro stations should give voice to the city’s cultural and historical landmarks, of which universities are surely a part,” said Wang Hongzhi, vice dean of the College of Materials Science and Engineering at Donghua University. “It should become a rule that Metro stations located near universities are named after the institutions.”

Gallery

References

Shanghai Metro stations in Changning District
Line 3, Shanghai Metro
Line 4, Shanghai Metro
Railway stations in China opened in 2000
Railway stations in Shanghai